D54 is a state road in the northern Dalmatia region of Croatia that branches off from D8 state road, facilitating access to Obrovac and D27 state road which in turn facilitates bypassing both Maslenica bridges.

The western terminus of the road is located near Maslenica, at D8 state road route. At its eastern terminus, the road connects to D27 state road which serves as a parallel road to the A1 motorway, connecting to Benkovac (to the south) and to Gračac (to the north) facilitating a bypass of Maslenica bridges in case of strong winds preventing use of both of the bridges.

The road, as well as all other state roads in Croatia, is managed and maintained by Hrvatske ceste, a state-owned company.

Traffic volume 

Traffic is regularly counted and reported by Hrvatske ceste, operator of the road. Substantial variations between annual (AADT) and summer (ASDT) traffic volumes are attributed to the fact that the road connects a number of summer resorts to Croatian motorway network and is used as a bypass road for a section of the A1 motorway.

Road junctions

Sources

D054
D054